MGQ or mgq may refer to:

 MGQ, the IATA code for Aden Adde International Airport, Mogadishu, Somalia
 MGQ, the Ministry of Railways station code for Machi Goth railway station, Punjab Province, Pakistan
 mgq, the ISO 639-3 code for Malila language, Tanzania